In molecular biology, glycoside hydrolase family 44 is a family of glycoside hydrolases.

Glycoside hydrolases  are a widespread group of enzymes that hydrolyse the glycosidic bond between two or more carbohydrates, or between a carbohydrate and a non-carbohydrate moiety. A classification system for glycoside hydrolases, based on sequence similarity, has led to the definition of >100 different families. This classification is available on the CAZy web site, and also discussed at CAZypedia, an online encyclopedia of carbohydrate active enzymes.

Glycoside hydrolase family 44 CAZY GH_44, formerly known as cellulase family J, includes enzymes with endoglucanase  and xyloglucanase  activities. The overall structure of enzymes in this family consists of a TIM-like barrel domain, a beta-sandwich domain and an active site with two glutamic acid residues, all of which are conserved between the endoglucanases and xyloglucanases in the family, with only minor differences.

References 

EC 3.2.1
GH family
Protein families